Lajos Fischer  (1 January 1902 – 1 January 1978) was a Hungarian footballer who played for VAC and Hakoah Vienna, and made appearances for the Hungarian national team.

Biography
Fischer was born in Hungary, and was Jewish.

In Budapest, he played for Vívó és Atlétikai Club. Fischer played as a goalkeeper for American Soccer League sides Brooklyn Wanderers, New York Giants, and Hakoah All-Stars. He played nine times for the Hungary national football team from 1924 to 1926.

See also
List of select Jewish football (association; soccer) players

References

1902 births
1978 deaths
Hungarian footballers
Hungarian expatriate footballers
Hungary international footballers
Brooklyn Wanderers players
Hakoah All-Stars players
American Soccer League (1921–1933) players
Place of birth missing
Association football goalkeepers
Expatriate soccer players in the United States
Hungarian expatriate sportspeople in the United States